The Potter County Courthouse is the primary government building of Potter County, Pennsylvania, United States.  Located in the Coudersport Historic District in the Potter county seat of Coudersport, it was added the National Register of Historic Places on February 24, 1975. The courthouse is a Greek Revival structure with some Victorian elements blended into it.

History 
The Potter County Courthouse was designed by William Bell of Warren County, with the construction beginning in 1851 and being completed in 1853. In 1888, the roof of the courthouse was altered, leading to controversary over the "squandering" of tax money on a relatively new courthouse. The courthouse was renovated by the Civil Works Administration in the winter of 1933–34.

See also
 List of state and county courthouses in Pennsylvania

References 

Courthouses on the National Register of Historic Places in Pennsylvania
Government buildings completed in 1853
County courthouses in Pennsylvania
Greek Revival architecture in Pennsylvania
Buildings and structures in Potter County, Pennsylvania
Clock towers in Pennsylvania
1853 establishments in Pennsylvania
National Register of Historic Places in Potter County, Pennsylvania
Individually listed contributing properties to historic districts on the National Register in Pennsylvania